Sarigyugh is a village in the Ijevan Municipality of the Tavush Province of Armenia.

Toponymy 
The village was previously known as Srygekh and Srigekh.

Gallery

References

External links 

Populated places in Tavush Province